Vertigo, in comics, may refer an imprint, or a character:

 Vertigo (DC Comics), an imprint of DC Comics
 Vertigo (Marvel Comics), two Marvel Comics characters
 Vertigo (Salem's Seven), another Marvel character
 Count Vertigo, a DC Comics supervillain

See also
Vertigo (disambiguation)